Jinjiang Park may refer to:
Jinjiang Action Park, an amusement park in Shanghai, China
Jinjiang Park (Shanghai Metro), a train station